Mark Redshaw (born 25 September 1984) is an English former professional footballer who played as a striker.

Career
According to a 2011 interview with the player, Redshaw signed for Manchester United at the age of eight and spent almost nine years at the club alongside schoolmate Phil Bardsley. He also played for Wrexham and Manchester City. After leaving Manchester City he played non-League football with Radcliffe Borough and Rossendale United. He moved to Caernarfon Town in December 2004. Redshaw returned to Rossendale United in September 2007, and joined Curzon Ashton in November.

He has also played in Australia for Stirling Lions, in Greece for Ethnikos Piraeus, in Iceland for Fram Reykjavik, and in the Netherlands for FC Oss.

Redshaw's move to Conference North club Chester in September 2012 fell through over problems with international clearance. He played a match for League One club Bury's reserve team as a trialist in November.

He played twice for Buxton in the Northern Premier League in October 2013 before moving to Mexico. After a trial with Mérida, he signed for Ascenso MX club Celaya in December. and made his debut in the Copa MX group stage win at Querétaro on 22 January 2014.

Personal life
His father is Ray Redshaw, and his brother is Jack, both of whom are footballers.

References
Infobox statistics
 
General

1984 births
Living people
English footballers
Manchester United F.C. players
Wrexham A.F.C. players
Manchester City F.C. players
Radcliffe F.C. players
Rossendale United F.C. players
Caernarfon Town F.C. players
Curzon Ashton F.C. players
Ethnikos Piraeus F.C. players
Knattspyrnufélagið Fram players
TOP Oss players
Buxton F.C. players
Club Celaya footballers
Northern Premier League players
Cymru Premier players
Úrvalsdeild karla (football) players
Eerste Divisie players
Expatriate footballers in Greece
Expatriate footballers in Mexico
Association football forwards